Robert H. Brandenberger (born 1956 in Bern) is a Swiss-Canadian theoretical cosmologist and a professor of physics at McGill University in Montreal, Quebec, Canada.

Biography
Brandenberger completed his undergraduate degree at ETH Zurich, in Switzerland, and went on to receive his Ph.D. from Harvard University. He was a postdoctoral student under Stephen Hawking at the DAMTP at Cambridge University. He also did postdoctoral work at the Institute for Theoretical Physics, University of California, Santa Barbara. Professor Brandenberger joined the faculty of Brown University in 1987 and then in 2004, he joined McGill University where he is a Canada Research Chair (Tier 1) holder. He is also an affiliate member of the Perimeter Institute for Theoretical Physics. Robert Brandenberger developed the theory of string gas cosmology, with colleague Cumrun Vafa. This theory is an alternative to inflationary cosmology.

Honors and awards
He has won numerous awards for his work, including the Alfred P. Sloan Research Fellowship in 1988, the Outstanding Junior Researcher award from the Department of Energy in 1988, the Killam Research Fellowship in 2009 and the CAP-CRM Prize in Theoretical and Mathematical Physics in 2011.

He was elected a Fellow of the American Physical Society in 2001

References

External links 

 Oral history interview transcript for Robert Brandenberger on 22 April 2021, American Institute of Physics, Niels Bohr Library & Archives

1954 births
Living people
ETH Zurich alumni
Swiss physicists
Academic staff of McGill University
Harvard University alumni
American string theorists
Fellows of the American Physical Society